Zadoinov is a Slavic masculine surname, its feminine counterpart is Zadoinova. It may refer to
Aliona Bolsova Zadoinova (born 1997), Spanish-Moldovan tennis player
Vadim Zadoynov (born 1969), Moldovan hurdler